Cao Jianguo (born August 1963) is a Chinese business executive currently serving as the Chairman of Aero Engine Corporation of China (AECC).

Biography
Cao was born in Zongyang County, Anhui, in August 1963. In September 1981 he entered Beihang University, where he graduated in July 1985. After university, he joined the Ministry of Aerospace Industry. He entered the workforce in March 1988, and joined the Communist Party of China in February 1992. In March 2016, he was promoted to Chairman of the newly founded Aero Engine Corporation of China.

He is a delegate to the 19th National Congress of the Communist Party of China and an alternate member of the 19th CPC Central Committee.

Honours and awards
 November 22, 2019 Member of the Chinese Academy of Engineering (CAE)

References

External links

1963 births
Living people
People from Zongyang County
Engineers from Zhejiang
Beihang University alumni
Members of the Chinese Academy of Engineering